Pili torti (singular pilus tortus; also known as "twisted hairs") is characterized by short and brittle hairs that appear flattened and twisted when viewed through a microscope.

This phenotype is noted in Menkes disease and Lichen planopilaris. Pili torti can also occur after use of retinoids, such as isotretinoin.

See also
 List of cutaneous conditions
 Crandall syndrome

References

External links 

Conditions of the skin appendages
Human hair
Hair diseases